Seth is an unincorporated community and coal town in Boone County, West Virginia, United States. Seth has a post office with ZIP code 25181.

The community was named after Seth Foster, who was instrumental in securing a post office for the town. Prior to Seth, it was initially named Coon's Mills up to at least the Civil War period.

References

Unincorporated communities in Boone County, West Virginia
Unincorporated communities in West Virginia
Coal towns in West Virginia